Faujdarhat is a neighborhood of Chittagong City in Bangladesh. It is well known as a ship breaking area, with one of the largest breaking yards in the world: Chittagong Ship Breaking Yard. There are several institutions including Faujdarhat Cadet College, the first cadet college in Bangladesh.

History
In 1995, the Forest Department created a  mangrove forest park that stretches from Faujdarhat to South Kattali in Chittagong. The area experienced a major oil spill when an oil-laden train derailed on 9 July 2014.

Ship breaking yard 

The beach in the area is used to demolish ships. At  in length, it is the longest ship breaking site in the world. Around 200,000 people work there and the industry contributes a lot to the Bangladesh economy.

Educational institutions

Cadet colleges
Faujdarhat Cadet College

High schools
 Faujdarhat Collegiate School
 Faujdarhat KM High School

College
 Faujdarhat Nursing College

Research institutes 
 Bangladesh Institute of Tropical and Infectious Diseases

University 
 Chittagong Medical University

References

Neighborhoods in Chittagong